Fabian Leimlehner (born ) is an Austrian male artistic gymnast and part of the national team. He participated at the 2012 Summer Olympics in London, United Kingdom. Leimlehner was part of the 2011 World Championships. In 2012 he competed at the European Artistic Gymnastics Team Championships. He also participated in the 2013, 2014, and 2015 World Championships.

References

Living people
Gymnasts at the 2012 Summer Olympics
1987 births
Austrian male artistic gymnasts
Olympic gymnasts of Austria
People from Liestal
European Games competitors for Austria
Gymnasts at the 2015 European Games
Sportspeople from Basel-Landschaft 
Swiss male artistic gymnasts
Swiss emigrants to Austria
Austrian people of Swiss descent